Darlene Joyce Luther (née Dunphy) (August 17, 1947 – January 30, 2002) was an American politician and business consultant.

Born in Cloquet, Minnesota, Luther graduated from White Bear High School in 1965. She went to University of Minnesota and graduated from University of St. Thomas with a degree in business administration. She was a business consultant, substitute teacher, and flight attendant. Luther served in the Minnesota House of Representatives from 1993 until her death in 2002. Luther was a Democrat. Her husband Bill Luther also served in the Minnesota Legislature and the United States House of Representatives. Luther died of stomach cancer at her house in Brooklyn Park, Minnesota.

Notes

1947 births
2002 deaths
People from Cloquet, Minnesota
University of Minnesota alumni
University of St. Thomas (Minnesota) alumni
Businesspeople from Minnesota
Women state legislators in Minnesota
Democratic Party members of the Minnesota House of Representatives
21st-century American politicians
21st-century American women politicians
20th-century American politicians
20th-century American businesspeople
20th-century American women politicians
Deaths from cancer in Minnesota
Deaths from stomach cancer